Lava River Cave is a lava tube in northern Arizona's Coconino National Forest. The cave was discovered by some lumbermen in 1915 and has historically been referred to as "Government Cave" due to its location on the eastern edge of Government Prairie and southeast of Government Peak. Today, Lava River Cave is freely accessible to the general public.

Geologists believe the cave was formed sometime between 650,000 and 700,000 years ago when molten lava erupted from a volcanic vent in nearby Hart Prairie. The top, sides and bottom of the flow cooled and solidified, while lava in the middle flowed out, leaving a hollow space to form the cave. Examples of both ʻAʻā and Pāhoehoe basaltic lava can be seen in the cave.

The cave is mostly dry, but due to the temperature change, there is a lot of condensation on the walls, ceiling and floor near the entrance, which makes it slippery. Temperatures inside are around 40 °F (5 °C) during the summer, and it is not uncommon for some of the rocks to be covered with ice. There are no light sources inside. It is recommended visitors have sturdy hiking boots, warm clothing, and multiple sources of light.

Litter and graffiti have been problems since the late 1960s. A major restoration effort was organized in May 1991. Almost all the litter was packed out and much of the graffiti removed at that time. Dogs should not be taken in the cave since there are only limited and very slow biological processes to render their urine and feces unobjectionable.

Being in Coconino National Forest, the cave is managed by the United States Forest Service. While the cave is open year-round, the dirt roads which lead there may be impassable to cars in winter months or during wet weather conditions. There are no entrance or use fees.

References

External links 
 Lava River Cave
 Coconino Lava River Cave, Arizona

Lava tubes
Caves of Arizona
Landforms of Coconino County, Arizona
Coconino National Forest
Protected areas of Coconino County, Arizona